Príncipe de Asturias was a steam ocean liner, built in Scotland for the Spanish Naviera Pinillos. She was launched in 1914 and wrecked in 1916 with the loss of at least 445 lives. She was the sister ship of Pinillos'  Infanta Isabel, which was launched in 1912.

Príncipe de Asturias was the last ocean liner to be built in the United Kingdom for a Spanish shipping line. Thereafter the Sociedad Española de Construcción Naval (SECN) developed its shipyards to meet the Spanish merchant fleet's need for larger and more modern ships.

The ship was named after the Prince of Asturias, the title of the heir apparent to the Spanish Crown. She is one of several ships to have been called Príncipe de Asturias.

Building
Russell & Co built Príncipe de Asturias in its Kingston yard at Port Glasgow, Scotland, launching her on 30 April 1914. Her sister Infanta Isabel had briefly been the largest ship in the Spanish merchant fleet. By the time Príncipe de Asturias had been built, Pinillos' main competitor, Compañía Transatlántica Española, had taken delivery of the larger liners Reina Victoria-Eugenia and Infanta Isabel de Borbón.

David Rowan & Co of Glasgow built Príncipe de Asturias engines. They were twin quadruple-expansion steam engines driving twin screws.

Route
In 1916 Príncipe de Asturias was assigned to the Barcelona – Buenos Aires route, with several intermediate ports of call, including Santos in Brazil.

Loss

Water entered her boiler room, causing some of her boilers to explode, and she lost power. The ship listed to starboard and soon capsized. She sank in five minutes, killing at least 445 of the 588 people aboard.

Only one lifeboat was launched, initially carrying 20 people. At the dawn and in the morning the lifeboat recovered more than 100 people. The French cargo ship Vega rescued 143 people, including the swimmer Marina Vidal and the only Brazilian on board, José Martins Vianna.

References

Bibliography

External links

 – list of crew and passenger names

1914 ships
1916 in Brazil
Maritime incidents in 1916
Maritime incidents in Brazil
Ocean liners
Passenger ships of Spain
Ships built on the River Clyde
Shipwrecks in the Atlantic Ocean
Steamships of Spain
1916 disasters in South America